60S ribosomal protein L10-like is a protein that in humans is encoded by the RPL10L gene.

Function 

This gene encodes a protein sharing sequence similarity with ribosomal protein L10 (RPL10). It is not currently known whether the encoded protein is a functional ribosomal protein or whether it has evolved a function that is independent of the ribosome. This gene is intronless.

References

Further reading

External links 
 

Ribosomal proteins